Deinandra increscens is a species of flowering plant in the family Asteraceae known by the common name grassland tarweed. It is endemic to California, where it has been found primarily in Monterey, San Luis Obispo and Santa Barbara Counties (including Santa Cruz and Santa Rosa Islands). A few isolated populations have been reported from Kern and Merced Counties, but these are from urban areas (Cities of Merced and Bakersfield) and probably represent cultivated specimens.

Deinandra increscens is an annual up to 100 cm (40 inches) tall. It has numerous flower heads, often tightly clumped together, each with yellow ray florets and disc florets with yellow corollas but red or purple anthers.

Subspecies
Deinandra increscens subsp. increscens grows along the California Central Coast and the coastal mountain ranges.
Deinandra increscens subsp. villosa (Gaviota tarweed) is a rare and endangered subspecies endemic to Santa Barbara County, where it is known only from an area on the Gaviota Coast.

References

External links
United States Department of Agriculture Plants Profile: Deinandra increscens
Deinandra increscens - Calphotos Photo Gallery, University of California

increscens
Endemic flora of California
Natural history of the California chaparral and woodlands
Natural history of the California Coast Ranges
Natural history of the Channel Islands of California
Natural history of the Transverse Ranges
Plants described in 1935
Flora without expected TNC conservation status